The 84th Line Infantry Regiment is an infantry unit of the French Army. It was heir of the Quercy Regiment and the 9th Light Regiment, created in 1684.

In December 1795 the 84e demi-brigade was created from the 36e and 116e demi-brigades as well as a battalion of Orleans volunteers. It fought in Switzerland and Germany and with distinction at the Battle of Höchstädt (1800).The third battalion was sent to Santo Domingo and later became part of the 82e ligne, the first two battalions as well as the third battalion of the 89e demi-brigade became part of the new 84e ligne.

In 1805 it was part of Marmont's II corps and fought at the Battle of Ulm and The Battle of Austerlitz after Austerlitz Marmot's corps was sent to Illyria (modern Croatia) and served as the garrison there until 1809. In 1809 the regiment was transferred to Prince Eugene's Army of Italy and took part in the defeat at Sacile and the victory on the piavac River but gained everlasting fame for its actions at the Battle of Graz on the 25th of June. Two battalions of the 84e under Colonel Gambin were dispatched to take the town and drive of the enemy who were believed to be few in number. The action began at night and Gambin's men soon found that there were more than just a few Austrians in Graz. They first took the church and 400 Croatian prisoners, who they locked in the church. They threw back a series of disjointed counterattacks by the Croatian Insurrection ([Landwehr]) and Austrian regulars but began to run out of ammunition and had to take rounds from the dead Austrians. At 3 pm a much more serious attack took place and the 84e almost lost its eagle standard, and lost its battalion guns. After 17 hours of fighting against a far superiour force, the situation was desperate but the rest of Boussier's Division arrived just in the nick of time. 

It was on the battlefield of Wagram that he presented the Emperor with the flags taken at Gratz: "Colonel," said Napoleon, "I am pleased with the bravery of your regiment and yours, you will have your eagles engraved: ONE AGAINST TEN. The 84th regiment also received 96 decorations of the Legion of Honor and an imperial decree of August 15 conferred on the colonel the title of count, with an endowment of 10,000 francs of annuity.

In 1812 it was part of the IV Corps in Russia and fought at the Battle of Smolensk (1812), Battle of Borodino, and the Battle of Maloyaroslavets, where it again fought with great distinction as the town changed hands eight times and General Alexis Delzons was killed leading the regiment during the battle. Reformed in 1813 it again served in Italy at the Battle of Feistritz, and the Battle of Caldiero. In 1815 two battalions fought at The Battle of Waterloo as part of the VI Corps, taking part in the battle for Placenoit.

References
Recueil d'Historiques de l'Infanterie Française by Serge Andolenko - Eurimprim 1969.

Infantry regiments of France